The Postman Always Rings Twice is a 1982 opera with a libretto written by Colin Graham and music by Stephen Paulus, based on the 1934  novel by James M. Cain, The Postman Always Rings Twice.

The opera was the first of four commissioned from Paulus by the Opera Theatre of St. Louis.  It opened to generally strong reviews, and prompted the critic from the New York Times, in an otherwise mixed notice, to call Paulus "a young man on the road to big things".

The opera has since been performed numerous times around the world, and Paulus composed eight more operas before his death in 2014.

Roles

Synopsis 
The story is of a drifter, Frank, who stops at a rural diner for a meal and ends up working there. The diner is operated by a young, beautiful woman, Cora, and her much older husband, Nick. Frank and Cora have an affair. Cora and Frank scheme to murder Nick to start a new life together without her losing the diner. Their first attempt at the murder is a failure, but they eventually succeed.

References

External links
 Bernard Holland, "A Novel Of Lust Becomes An Opera", New York Times, 2 July 1998. Review of a 1998 New York production

Operas
English-language operas
Operas set in the United States
1982 operas
Adultery in theatre
Operas by Stephen Paulus
Operas based on novels